The 2001–02 NBA season was the Nuggets' 26th season in the National Basketball Association, and 35th season as a franchise. During the off-season, the Nuggets signed free agents Isaiah Rider and Avery Johnson. However, Rider would play in just ten games before being waived on November 20. After finishing just two games below .500 the previous season, the Nuggets suffered another disastrous setback as Antonio McDyess suffered a preseason knee injury, which limited him to just ten games. The Nuggets got off to a 6–5 start, but then lost nine of their next ten games.

Things would only get worse on December 11 after a 99–96 home loss to the Charlotte Hornets, as head coach Dan Issel got into hot water after yelling a racial slur at a Mexican fan; Issel was suspended for four games and was forced to resign, being replaced by his assistant Mike Evans after a 9–17 start. At midseason, Nick Van Exel was traded along with Johnson, Raef LaFrentz and Tariq Abdul-Wahad to the Dallas Mavericks in exchange for Juwan Howard, All-Star guard Tim Hardaway, and second-year forward Donnell Harvey. The Nuggets went on a 7-game losing streak in March, and finished sixth in the Midwest Division with a 27–55 record.

Howard averaged 17.9 points and 7.9 rebounds per game with the team, while McDyess averaged 11.3 points and 5.5 rebounds per game. Following the season, McDyess was traded to the New York Knicks, while Voshon Lenard signed as a free agent with the Toronto Raptors, Calbert Cheaney signed with the Utah Jazz, George McCloud was traded to the Washington Wizards, but was released to free agency, Hardaway was released, and Evans was fired as head coach.

Offseason

Draft picks

Roster

Roster Notes
 Shooting guard Isaiah Rider was waived on November 20.

Regular season

Season standings

z - clinched division title
y - clinched division title
x - clinched playoff spot

Record vs. opponents

Game log

Player statistics

Regular season

Player Statistics Citation:

Awards and records

Transactions

References

See also
 2001-02 NBA season

Denver Nuggets seasons
Denver Nuggets
Denver Nuggets
Denver Nug